The Stahlman is a historic building in Nashville, Tennessee, U.S. It was completed in 1907 for Major Edward Bushrod Stahlman.

History
It was built by Major Edward Bushrod Stahlman. When the Stahlman building opened in 1907, it housed the Fourth National Bank. The original vault still resides in the basement. It remained in the Stahlman family until the 1950s.

Over 100 years old, the building has been renovated into loft apartments and retail space.} Since 1967, its roof has featured large neon letters spelling the callsign of radio station WKDF (and before that, its predecessor, WKDA), which occupied part of the building until moving to new facilities in 1978.

Architectural significance
The building was designed by architects James Edwin Ruthven Carpenter, Jr.  and Walter D. Blair. It has been listed on the National Register of Historic Places as a contributing property to the Nashville Financial Historic District  since March 20, 2002.

References

External links
 The Stahlman Official Site

Skyscrapers in Nashville, Tennessee
Office buildings completed in 1907
1907 establishments in Tennessee
Beaux-Arts architecture in Tennessee
Residential skyscrapers in Tennessee
National Register of Historic Places in Davidson County, Tennessee